The Northern Ireland Open is a golf tournament formerly played on the Challenge Tour. It was played for the first time in June 2010 on the PGA EuroPro Tour at Galgorm Castle Golf Club in Ballymena, Northern Ireland. It now features on the Clutch Pro Tour schedule.

History
In 2017, the event was changed from 72 holes of stroke play to a "Super 6" style format. The format was similar to that used for the World Super 6 Perth. The main difference was that the 6-hole matches were determined by stroke play rather than match play. It retained the 156-player field, with the cut being made at the top-60 and ties after 36 holes. After 54 holes, the field was cut to a fixed 24.  Ties for 24th place were determined by a sudden-death playoff. There were then five six-hole knock-out rounds on the final day. The leading eight after 54 holes received a bye in the first round. The remaining 16 were randomly paired. The six holes used on the final day were 17, 5, 6, 7, 8 and 18. There were  a number of other matches for the minor places.

In 2018, the event reverted to 72-hole stroke-play.

The 2020 event returned to the Challenge Tour as the Northern Ireland Open with backing from The R&A.

Winners

See also
ISPS Handa World Invitational

Notes

References

External links
NI Open official website

Former Challenge Tour events
Golf tournaments in Northern Ireland
Sport in Ballymena
Recurring sporting events established in 2010
2010 establishments in Northern Ireland